Anton Henrik Ræder (25 November 1855 – 26 January 1941) was a Norwegian educator, philologist and historian. He is most commonly known for his history textbooks relating to the Roman Empire.

Biography
Anton Ræder was born in Christiania (now Oslo), Norway. He was the son of jurist Nicolai Ditlev Ammon Ræder (1817–84) and Johanne  Cathrine Scheel (1830-1910). He was the brother of military officer Johan Christopher Ræder. His uncles included  military officers
Georg Ræder and Jacques Ræder as well as diplomat Ole Munch Ræder.

Ræder attended Oslo Cathedral School. He received a classical education in both Latin and Greek history and geography. He earning his doctorate degree during 1893 from the Royal Frederiks University (now  University of Oslo)  
with his thesis Athens politiske udvikling i tiden fra Kleisthenes til Artideide's reform.

From 1898 to 1900 he was the school inspector and head of primary schools in Christiania. From 1900 to 1907, he was Director General of the Ministry of Church teaching. He served as rector of Oslo Cathedral School from 1907 to 1927. He was a member of Oslo city council (1902–07) and  chairman of Oslo School Board (1909).

Personal life
Ræder was first married to Astrid Greve (1874-1947). Following her death, he married  Mathilde Uchermann, daughter of doctor and professor Vilhelm Uchermann (1852-1929) in 1928.

He was a member of the  Norwegian Academy of Science and Letters. In 1883, he was awarded the Crown Prince's gold medal (Kronprinsens gullmedalje). He was Knight, First Class of the Order of St. Olav and Commander, Second Class of the Order of Vasa and of the Order of Dannebrog. He has been portrayed by Johan Nordhagen (painting) and Gustav Vigeland (bust).

Selected works

 Kulturhistoriske skildringer fra den romerske keisertid, 1904 
L'Arbitrage international chez les Hellenes, 1912

References

1855 births
1941 deaths
Writers from Oslo
People educated at Oslo Cathedral School
University of Oslo alumni
20th-century Norwegian historians
Heads of schools in Norway
Norwegian textbook writers
Commanders of the Order of Vasa
Commanders of the Order of the Dannebrog
Recipients of the St. Olav's Medal
19th-century Norwegian historians